Malang Plain is a group of nine ash cones, maars and volcanic plugs. It is located around the city of Malang, from southeast to northeast, in East Java, Indonesia. Some of the cones might be parasitic cones from Tengger caldera complex.

See also 

 List of volcanoes in Indonesia

References 

Volcanoes of East Java
Maars of Indonesia
Volcanic plugs of Asia